The Cone Nebula is an H II region in the constellation of Monoceros. It was discovered by William Herschel on December 26, 1785, at which time he designated it H V.27. The nebula is located about 830 parsecs or 2,700 light-years away from Earth. The Cone Nebula forms part of the nebulosity surrounding the Christmas Tree Cluster. The designation of NGC 2264 in the New General Catalogue refers to both objects and not the nebula alone.

The diffuse Cone Nebula, so named because of its apparent shape, lies in the southern part of NGC 2264, the northern part being the magnitude-3.9 Christmas Tree Cluster.  It is in the northern part of Monoceros, just north of the midpoint of a line from Procyon to Betelgeuse.

The cone's shape comes from a dark absorption nebula consisting of cold molecular hydrogen and dust in front of a faint emission nebula containing hydrogen ionized by S Monocerotis, the brightest star of NGC 2264.  The faint nebula is approximately seven light-years long (with an apparent length of 10 arcminutes), and is 2,700 light-years away from Earth.

The nebula is part of a much larger star-forming complex—the Hubble Space Telescope was used to capture images of forming stars in 1997.

See also
 Perceptions of religious imagery in natural phenomena

Notes and references

External links

 
 
 Cone Nebula pictures from ESA-Hubble
 Hubble image of Cone Nebula
 

NGC 2264
Dark nebulae
Diffuse nebulae
Monoceros (constellation)
H II regions
1785 in science